Burnham Norton is a village and civil parish in the English county of Norfolk, one of the Burnhams, an adjacent group in the northernmost part of Norfolk, on the A149 some 2 km north of the larger village of Burnham Market, 35 km north-east of King's Lynn and 60 km north-west of Norwich. "Burnham" means "Homestead/village on the River Burn" or perhaps, "hemmed-in land on the River Burn". "Norton", meaning "North farm/settlement", distinguishes it from the other Norfolk Burnhams.

Inhabitants
The civil parish has an area of 14.27 km.2 In the 2001 census it had a population of 76 in 37 households. The 2011 census population of 173 was estimated at 156 in 2019.

For the purposes of local government, the parish falls within the district of King's Lynn and West Norfolk.

The village is located close to the coast, and overlooks the tidal Norton Marshes and Scolt Head Island NNR.

Church of St Margaret
The church of Burnham Norton St Margaret is one of 124 existing round-tower churches in Norfolk, and is a Grade I listed building.

David Jamieson VC is buried in the churchyard, as are Lady Margaret Douglas-Home, who was a great aunt of Diana, Princess of Wales, and Richard Woodget, master of the Cutty Sark.

References

External links
St Margaret's on the European Round Tower Churches Website

.
Information from Genuki Norfolk on Burnham Norton.
Norfolkcoast.co.uk on Burnham Norton.

Villages in Norfolk
King's Lynn and West Norfolk
Populated coastal places in Norfolk
Civil parishes in Norfolk